The 1992 Copa Libertadores Final was a two-legged football match-up to determine the 1992 Copa Libertadores champion. The final was contested by Brazilian club São Paulo and Argentine side Newell's Old Boys. The first leg was held in Estadio Gigante de Arroyito (home venue of club Rosario Central) where Newell's beat Sao Paulo 1–0 in front of 35,000 spectators.

In the second leg, held in Estádio do Morumbi, Sao Paulo defeated Newell's 1–0. As both teams tied on points and goal difference, a penalty shootout was conducted to decide a champion. Sao Paulo won the series 3–2 on penalties, therefore the Brazilian team won their first Copa Libertadores trophy.

Qualified teams

Venues

Match details

First leg

Source

Second leg

Source

References

l
l
1
l
l
l